Jonathan Bau-Bau Bonaparte Hart (born Crozierville, Montserrado County, 9 January 1953) is a Liberian Episcopalian bishop. He has been Archbishop and Primate of the Church of the Province of West Africa since 3 March 2019.

Biography
Hart graduated at the Cuttington University in Liberia. He later studied also at the Episcopal Divinity School, in Cambridge, United States, where he took a Master of Divinity degree.

He has been bishop of the Episcopal Diocese of Liberia since 2 March 2008. He was elected by the Electoral College of the Internal Province of West Africa of the Church of the Province of West Africa on 1 March 2014, to be the new archbishop, replacing Solomon Tilewa Johnson of Gambia, who had died suddenly shortly before. He was enthroned at the Cathedral Church of the Holy Trinity, in Monrovia, at 6 July 2014.

He was enthroned as the Primate and Archbishop of the Church of the Province of West Africa at the Cathedral Church of the Holy Trinity, in Monrovia, on 3 March 2019.

He attended the 7th Global South Conference, held in Cairo, Egypt, on 11–12 October 2019.

References

External links
Archbishop Hart Named Head of CPWA, Daily Observer, 5 March 2019

1953 births
Living people
Liberian Episcopalians
21st-century Anglican bishops in Africa
21st-century Anglican archbishops
People from Montserrado County
Cuttington University alumni
Anglican archbishops of West Africa
Anglican bishops of Liberia